Lukáš Horníček (born 13 July 2002) is a Czech professional footballer who plays as a goalkeeper for Portuguese club Braga.

Club career
Horníček is a youth product of the academies of the Czech clubs Sokol Dobříkov and Pardubice. On 19 July 2019, he signed on a trial loan with the Portuguese club Braga for one year with an option to buy. On 24 July 2020, he signed permanently with Braga in what was Pardubice's biggest sale in their history. He was named the best goalkeeper for the Liga Revelação 2020/21 season for Braga's youth team. For the 2021–22 season, he was promoted to Braga B. He made his first senior debut with Braga in a 5–0 Taça de Portugal win over Moitense, coming on as a late substitute in the 85th minute. He made his Primeira Liga debut with Braga in a 3–2 loss to Famalicão on 15 May 2022.

International career
Horníček is a youth international for the Czech Republic, having represented the Czech Republic U17s at the 2019 UEFA European Under-17 Championship.

Honours
Braga
Taça de Portugal: 2020–21

References

External links
 
 
 Fotbal.CZ Profile
 Liga Portugal profile

Living people
2002 births
People from Vysoké Mýto
Sportspeople from the Pardubice Region
Czech footballers
Association football goalkeepers
Czech Republic youth international footballers
Primeira Liga players
S.C. Braga players
Czech expatriate footballers
Czech expatriate sportspeople in Portugal
Expatriate footballers in Portugal